Senna gaudichaudii, known as Gaudichaud's senna and as heuhiuhi in Hawaiian, is a species of flowering plant in the legume family, Fabaceae, that is endemic to Queensland, Australia and the Pacific Islands.

References

gaudichaudii
Plants described in 1982
Flora of Fiji
Flora of Hawaii
Flora of New Caledonia
Flora of the Pitcairn Islands
Flora of Queensland
Flora of the Tubuai Islands
Flora of Vanuatu
Fabales of Australia
Flora without expected TNC conservation status